The men's surf race in lifesaving at the 2001 World Games took place on 26 August 2001 at the Iwaki Island Park in Iwaki, Japan.

Competition format
A total of 27 athletes entered the competition.

Results

References

External links
 Results on IWGA website

Lifesaving at the 2001 World Games